Diary of a Lover is a Johnny Thunders song from the album "Hurt me" recorded throughout 1985. "Green Onions", "Look In My Eyes" and "Diary of a Lover" were recorded at Euphoria Sound Studios, Revere, Massachusetts. The other tracks were recorded at Downtown Recorders, Boston, Massachusetts.

Track listing

Side A
"Green Onions"
"Look In My Eyes"
"Just Another Girl"

Side B
"In Cold Blood"
"Diary of a Lover"
"Endless Party"

Personnel
Johnny Thunders - guitar, vocals, bass
Billy Rogers - drums
Joe Mazzari - guitar on "Endless Party"
Walter Lure - guitar on "Green Onions", "Look In My Eyes" and "Diary of a Lover"
Simon Ritt - drums on "Green Onions", "Look In My Eyes" and "Diary of a Lover"; acoustic guitar and harmonica on "Endless Party"
Keith Chagnon - drums on "Green Onions", "Look In My Eyes" and "Diary of a Lover"
Carl Biancucci - additional bass on "Green Onions"
Executive producers - Jim Nestor and Christoph Gierke

Johnny Thunders albums
1983 albums
Albums produced by Jimmy Miller